Olav Hansson (born 23 July 1957 in Vestre Aker, Oslo) is a Norwegian former ski jumper who competed from 1982 to 1987. At the 1982 FIS Nordic World Ski Championships in Oslo, he won a gold medal in the team large hill and a silver medal in the individual large hill.

Hansson was known as "Stilhopperen fra Røa", and always jumped in a full white jumping suit. He finished second a total of seven other times in his individual career at various hills between 1982 and 1987.

External links 

Norwegian male ski jumpers
1957 births
Living people
FIS Nordic World Ski Championships medalists in ski jumping
Skiers from Oslo
20th-century Norwegian people